Gavin Jones (born 1 February 1980, in Maesteg) is a former Welsh professional squash player. He reached a career high of 37 in the world in December 2005. He represented Wales in the Commonwealth Games in 2002 and 2006.

References

1980 births
Living people
Welsh male squash players
Squash players at the 2002 Commonwealth Games
Squash players at the 2006 Commonwealth Games
Commonwealth Games competitors for Wales
Sportspeople from Maesteg